Bathytoma nonplicata is an extinct species of sea snail, a marine gastropod mollusk in the family Borsoniidae.

Distribution
This extinct marine species was endemic to the Eocene of the United States (Alabama, Louisiana, Texas) in the age range between 48.6 Ma to 37.2 Ma

Description
This species is considered an epifaunal carnivore.

References

nonplicata